Blackburn Cemetery, sometimes known as Blackburn Old Cemetery,  is a public cemetery in the town of Blackburn, Lancashire which lies on Whalley New Road with views over the town. It opened on 1st July 1857.

Noteworthy interments
 James Dixon (1855–1936) – philanthropist, known as "The Blackburn Samaritan", he founded the Ragged School and the orphanage at Wilpshire
 Frederick Kempster, the "English Giant" or "Blackburn Giant" (1889–1918) – over 7 feet tall and worked in showbusiness as a "giant"
 Elizabeth Ann Lewis (1849–1924) – celebrated as the "Temperance Queen" or "Drunkard's Friend"
 John Lewis (1855–1926) – football referee and founder of Blackburn Rovers
 James Pitts VC (1877–1955) – Victoria Cross recipient, a hero of the Siege of Ladysmith in the Boer War
 Fergus Suter (1857–1916) – Arguably the first recognised professional footballer
 Thomas Thwaites (c. 1809–1871) – owner of Thwaites Brewery

References

External links
 Blackburn with Darwen Council
 

Cemeteries in Lancashire
Buildings and structures in Blackburn with Darwen
Parks and commons in Blackburn with Darwen
1857 establishments in England